The Island of Flowers (Montenegrin: Ostrvo cvijeća/Острво цвијећа), also known as Miholjska Prevlaka, or Island of St. Archangel Michael, is an island in the Tivat municipality in the Bay of Kotor, on the Montenegrin Littoral. It has population of 100 people. The Island of Flowers is located near the town of Tivat, in the Bay of Kotor. The island is 300 m long and 200 m wide. It is connected with the mainland by a narrow isthmus. Today, the island is inhabited by about a hundred people, mainly living in bungalows.

The island includes a monastery dedicated to Archangel Michael, built in the early 13th century by Saint Sava, the medieval seat of the Metropolitanate of Montenegro. It was a tourist resort for Yugoslav military personnel, closed for the general public in the Socialist Yugoslavia period.

History

In the Middle Ages the two adjacent islands, Island of Flowers and Sveti Marko Island, were named islands of Sveti Mihailo and Sveti Gavrilo respectively, after the two holy archangels. After the Montenegrin littoral became part of the Venetian Republic, both islands were renamed. Sveti Mihailo Island became Miholjska Prevlaka, while Sveti Gavrilo Island island became first named Stradioti, then Sveti Marko Island.

Monastery

The Monastery of Saint Archangel Michael was founded by Serbian Archbishop Sava (s. 1219–35). The church base was built earlier, reconstructed in the 9th century and destroyed in the 11th century. The monastery was the seat of the Eparchy of Zeta between the 13th and 15th centuries. Under planned restoration, the monastery was destroyed by the Republic of Venice in 1441 after it was proclaimed unsafe due to the rumors of a plague breakout. Recent research by the Military Medical Academy in Belgrade, using recovered remains of monks from that time have revealed that the monks died probably due to arsenic poisoning. There are remains of the church base.

See also
Sveti Marko Island
Prevlaka Peninsula, also located in the Bay of Kotor, bordering Croatia

References

External links

Islands of Montenegro
Islands of the Adriatic Sea
Tivat Municipality